Il Penseroso ("the thinker") is a poem by John Milton, first found in the 1645/1646 quarto of verses The Poems of Mr. John Milton, both English and Latin, published by Humphrey Moseley.  It was presented as a companion piece to L'Allegro, a vision of poetic mirth.  The speaker of this reflective ode dispels "vain deluding Joys" from his mind in a ten-line prelude, before invoking "divinest Melancholy" to inspire his future verses. The melancholic mood is idealised by the speaker as a means by which to "attain / To something like prophetic strain," and for the central action of Il Penseroso – which, like L'Allegro, proceeds in couplets of iambic tetrameter – the speaker speculates about the poetic inspiration that would transpire if the imagined goddess of Melancholy he invokes were his Muse.  The highly digressive style Milton employs in L'Allegro and Il Penseroso dually precludes any summary of the poems' dramatic action as it renders them interpretively ambiguous to critics. However, it can surely be said that the vision of poetic inspiration offered by the speaker of Il Penseroso is an allegorical exploration of a contemplative paradigm of poetic genre.

Background
It is uncertain when L'Allegro and Il Penseroso were composed, as they do not appear in Milton's Trinity College manuscript of poetry. However, the settings found in the poem suggest that they were possibly composed ca. 1631 shortly after Milton left Cambridge in 1629.

Poem
As prelude to his invocation of Melancholy, the speaker dismisses joy from his imagination. Its rhythm of alternate lines of iambic trimeter and iambic pentameter is identical to that of the first 10 lines of L'Allegro:

The speaker invokes a Melancholy goddess, veiled in black:

... and, following the form of classical hymn, claims her heritage with the Roman pantheon:

Having invoked the Melancholy goddess, the speaker imagines her ideal personification:

The central action of the poem proceeds as poetic visions of Melancholy, imagined by the speaker:

At the end of his reverie on poetic Melancholy, the speaker invokes the Muse's song; he imagines that his Muse will reward his studious devotion to her by revealing a heavenly vision:   

As the final ten lines reveal, the speaker aspires to a revelation of divine knowledge to inspire his great poetry:   

The final couplet issues an ultimatum to the Melancholy mood; the speaker will devote himself to the existence of a solitary hermit, staking his life upon the contemplative ideal he has illustrated throughout the poem, which he imagines will be rewarded by a vision of the divine.

Themes
According to Barbara Lewalski, Il Penseroso, along with L'Allegro, "explore and contrast in generic terms the ideal pleasures appropriate to contrasting lifestyles ... that a poet might choose, or might choose at different times, or in sequence". In particular, Il Penseroso celebrates Melancholy through the traditional Theocritan pastoral model. The setting focuses on a Gothic scene and emphasises a solitary scholarly life. The speaker of the poem invokes a melancholic mood main character wanders through an urban environment and the descriptions are reminiscent of medieval settings. The main character, in his pursuits, devotes his time to philosophy, to allegory, to tragedy, to Classical hymns, and, finally, to Christian hymns that cause him to be filled with a vision. Besides being set in a traditional form, there is no poetic antecedent for Milton's pairing.

Melancholy, in Il Penseroso, does not have the same parentage as Mirth does in L'Allegro; Melancholy comes from Saturn and Vesta, who are connected to science and a focus on the heavens. Melancholy is connected in the poem with the "heavenly" muse Urania, the goddess of inspiring epics, through her focus and through her relationship with Saturn. Furthermore, she is related to prophecy, and the prophetic account within the final lines of Il Penseroso does not suggest that isolation is ideal, but they do emphasise the importance of experience and an understanding of nature. The higher life found within the poem, as opposed to the one within L'Allegro, allows an individual to experience such a vision.

The poems have been classified in various traditions and genres by various scholars, including: as academic writing by E. M. W. Tillyard; as pastoral by Sara Watson; as part of classical philosophy by Maren-Sofie Rostvig; as part of Renaissance encomia by S. P. Woodhouse and Douglas Bush, and as similar to Homeric hymns and Pindaric odes. Stella Revard believes that the poems follow the classical hymn model which discuss goddesses that are connected to poetry and uses these females to replace Apollo completely.

Critical reception
During the eighteenth century, both Il Penseroso and L'Allegro were popular and were widely imitated. The poet and engraver William Blake, who was deeply influenced by Milton's poetry and personality, made illustrations to both L'Allegro and Il Penseroso. 

L'Allegro, il Penseroso ed il Moderato is a pastoral ode by George Frideric Handel based on the poem. In an attempt to unite the two poems into a singular "moral design", at Handel's request, Charles Jennens added a new poem, "il Moderato", to create a third movement. 

Stella Revard believes that Milton, in his first publication of poems, "takes care to showcase himself as a poet in these first and last selections and at the same time to build his poetic reputation along the way by skillful positioning of poems such as L'Allegro and Il Penseroso."

Notes

References
 Havens, Raymond. The Influence of Milton on English Poetry. New York: Russell & Russell, 1961.
 Kerrigan, William; Rumrich, John; and Fallon, Stephen (eds.) The Complete Poetry and Essential Prose of John Milton. New York: The Modern Library, 2007.
 Lewalski, Barbara. "Genre" in A Companion to Milton. Ed. Thomas Corns. Oxford: Blackwell Publishing, 2003.
 Osgood, Charles. The Classical Mythology of Milton's English Poems. New York: Holt, 1900.
 Revard, Stella. Milton and the Tangles of Neaera's Hair. Columbia: University of Missouri Press, 1997.
 Røstvig, Maren-Sofie. The Happy Man: Studies in the Metamorphosis of a Classical Idea, 1600–1700. Oslo: Oslo University Press, 1962.
 Tillyard, E. M. W. "Milton: 'L'Allegro' and 'Il Penseroso in The Miltonic Setting, Past and Present. Cambridge: Cambridge University Press, 1938.
 Watson, Sara. "Milton's Ideal Day: Its Development as a Pastoral Theme". PMLA 57 (1942): 404–420.
 Woodhouse, A. S. P. and Bush, Douglas. Variorum: The Minor English Poems Vol 2. New York: Columbia University Press, 1972.

External links

Il Penseroso at Dartmouth College 
William Blake's illustrations
Handel's L'Allegro, il Penseroso ed il Moderato'', based partly on this poem.

British poems
1645 poems
Poetry by John Milton
Hudson River School paintings